Cape Lazarev may refer to:

 Cape Lazarev, Novaya Zemlya, Russia
 Cape Lazarev, Sevastopol, Russia
 Cape Lazarev, Strait of Tartary, Russia
 Cape Lazarev, Tunaycha, Russia
 Cape Lazarev, Unimak Island (Lazaref Cape), USA